1st Down was a Detroit hip-hop group consisting of Jay Dee and Phat Kat.

The duo signed to Payday Records in 1995, and released one 12", "A Day Wit' The Homies", before disbanding as a group, due to label trouble. They once again reunited for Phat Kat's Dedication to the Suckers EP, in 1999, which was produced entirely by Jay Dee.  Some of their further collaborations can be found on Slum Village's Fan-Tas-Tic (Vol. 1), Jay Dee's Welcome 2 Detroit, and both of Phat Kat's solo albums, The Undeniable LP and Carte Blanche.

Discography 
No Place To Go - 12" single (1993)
A Day Wit' The Homies EP - 12" single (1995)
Track listing:
A Day Wit The Homiez (Radio Version)
A Day Wit The Homiez (Main Version)
A Day Wit The Homiez (Instrumental)
A Day Wit The Homiez (Acapella)
Front Street (Radio Version)
Front Street (Main Version)
Front Street (Instrumental)
Front Street (Acapella)

External links
Phat Kat Interview @ dropmagazine.com

J Dilla
Midwest hip hop groups
Detroit hip hop groups